Harivansh Tana Bhagat Indoor Stadium is a multipurpose stadium in Ranchi city of India. It is owned by the Jharkhand's State authority and is the home ground for Patna Pirates in the 2017 season of ProKabbadi League. The stadium was also the venue of the 2011 National Games of India.

References

Multi-purpose stadiums in India
Sports venues completed in 2011
2011 establishments in Jharkhand
Sports venues in Ranchi